Jamai Raja may refer to:

 Jamai Raja (film)
 Jamai Raja (2014 TV series)
 Jamai Raja (2017 TV series)